Somesh (Hindi:सोमेश pronounced: soːmeːʂ) is a Hindu given name used among South Asian people especially in India for males. Somesh is also one of the names of the Hindu God Vishnu. It appears in the Vishnu Sahasranam (विष्णु सहस्रणाम, "1000 names of Vishnu"). It is also one of the names of Lord of Moon

Sources 

Indian masculine given names